Belleview High School is a school located In Belleview, Florida. It serves the Belleview area and the southern part of Marion County, Florida. The school mascot is the Eastern Diamondback Rattlesnake, and the school colors are blue, silver, and white. The school offers an Advanced International Certificate of Education (AICE) program. The  campus has a stadium with seating for 2,000 people and a Gymnasium capable of holding 1,400 spectators.

History
Belleview High School (BHS) is located in a rural area just west of US Highway 441, ten miles south of Ocala. Currently, it serves over 1,700 students. The racial composition of the community is predominantly white (63%), with approximately 8% African American, 23% Hispanic, .5% Asian, and 7.8% Multiracial.

BHS operates on a 6 class per day schedule, with exceptions for Thursday and Friday. This entails 6 classes for Monday, Tuesday and Wednesday, but on Thursday classes are twice as long and only cover the 1st, 3rd and 5th classes in a student's schedule. On Friday the process is similar but with the 2nd, 4th and 6th classes. This address CIM strategies by department developed plans and assess the skills by the district calendar.

In 2006, BHS was awarded an Innovation Fair Grant to be used to plan for the expansion of academies to include all BHS students. In addition to academies, BHS offers dual enrollment programs, Advanced International Certificate of Education (AICE) courses, and a General Educational Development (GED) program.

Notable alumni
Megan Boone, actress

References

External links
Belleview High School website
Marion County Public Schools website
BHS AICE Website
Belleview High School Facebook Page

High schools in Marion County, Florida
Educational institutions established in 1996
Public high schools in Florida
1996 establishments in Florida